Greenshaw High School is a coeducational academy of some 1600 pupils  situated in Sutton, England.
 
The school was opened in the late 1960s as a purpose-built Comprehensive School. The first Headmaster was Mr R B Whellock.

Greenshaw became an academy on 1 June 2011. In October 2014 it was reconstituted as a multi academy trust under the name 'Greenshaw Learning Trust'. It also has a sixth form for students aged 16 to 18. In 2008, students in the Greenshaw Sixth Form achieved results in the top 25% of schools nationally. It has been awarded the Arts Council Silver award, Associate Training School, Investor in People and Healthy School awards.

The school was rated 'Good' in 2012 by Ofsted.

Notable pupils

 Barry Winch, Olympic gymnast
 Steve Spooner, professional footballer
 Harry Aikines-Aryeetey, athlete
 Sam Ardley, actor
 Tayler Marshall, actor
 Bradley McIntosh, musician
 Jack Spring, film director

References

External links

Ofsted

Academies in the London Borough of Sutton
Secondary schools in the London Borough of Sutton
Sutton, London